Sinus Fidei  (Latin sinus fideī "Bay of Trust") is a small basaltic mare feature in the north of Mare Vaporum on the Moon.

See also
Volcanism on the Moon

References

External links

Sinus Fidei at The Moon Wiki

Fidei